The slender-billed inezia (Inezia tenuirostris) or slender-billed tyrannulet, is a species of bird in the family Tyrannidae. It is found in Northeastern Colombia and Northwestern Venezuela Its natural habitats are subtropical or tropical dry forests and subtropical or tropical dry shrubland.

Known for being small and very active. Looks greenish brown with yellowish underbody.

References

slender-billed inezia
Birds of Colombia
Birds of Venezuela
slender-billed inezia
slender-billed inezia
Taxonomy articles created by Polbot